Waiyaki Wa Hinga, was the son of Kumale ole Lemotaka, a Maasai whose family had sought refuge in Muranga, most probably during the Lloikop wars. Due to his Maasai background, Kumale ole Lemotaka was given the name Hinga by the Kikuyu. This name, meaning dissembler, was given to those who lived amongst Kikuyus but spoke the Maa language, or those who had lived among Maasais before. Waiyaki Wa Hinga was the owner of a large Agikuyu fort at the frontier of Kikuyu country. Upon encountering the Imperial British East Africa Company, he was genuinely interested in establishing and cementing ties with them. We see this when Waiyaki welcomes Frederick Lugard, and gives him land so hat he can set-up a fort. However, there was a mis-understanding right from the very beginning on which position Waiyaki held in Kikuyu society. British officials understood him to be the "Paramount Chiefs of the Agikuyu". However, Kikuyus did not have paramount chiefs in their political system; Waiyaki was a Kikuyu Muthamaki (singular) out of the many influential athamakis (plural). In Kikuyu society, a muthamaki was a spokesman, the chairman of a territorial unit and leader of his age-set. Athamakis were the first or leading personalities among peers; their role was highly controlled by their fellow peers. Given this, Waiyaki Wa Hinga did not hold the most superior position amongst Kabete Kikuyus. He had no powers to make a treaty that affected the welfare of the community, nor even control the warriors, which Waiyaki tried to do a number of times when he soldiers wanted to attack the company. So when there were constant mis-understandings between the Company and the Kikuyu community at Lugard’s Fort, any retaliation by the Kikuyu community to the Company was not done so at Waiyaki’s command. In 1892, a quarrel between him and Purkiss leads to his death. This is after an expedition to punish Kikuyus of Githinguri for killing Maktubu, a worker of the Imperial British East Africa Company, fails. Purkiss is angry with Waiyaki as it was him who warned the community. Waiyaki feared his cattle would be impounded together with those of the culprits who had murdered Maktubu. A row flared between him and Purkiss. Waiyaki was then wounded in the head with his own sword, which he had drawn to attack Purkiss with. Due to this, Waiyaki is taken to Mombasa to be tried under IBEACo. Unfortunately, he never reached Mombasa: he died and was buried at Kibwezi en route to the kenyan coast. Waiyaki Way in central Nairobi is reportedly named after him.

References 

Kenyan rebels